Kuppahalli Sitaramayya Sudarshan (18 June 1931 – 15 September 2012) was the fifth Sarsanghachalak of the Rashtriya Swayamsevak Sangh (RSS), a Hindu nationalist organisation from 2000 to 2009.


Biography
Sudarshan was born in a Sanketi brahmin family at Raipur (now in Chhattisgarh).  He received his Bachelor of Engineering in Telecommunications (honours) from Jabalpur Engineering College (formerly named as Government Engineering college) in Jabalpur. His parents hailed from Kuppahalli village, Mandya District of Karnataka.

He was only nine years old when he first attended an RSS Shakha. He was appointed as a Pracharak in 1954. His first posting as a pracharak was in Raigarh district of Madhya Pradesh(Now Chhattisgarh). In 1964, he was made the prant pracharak of Madhya Bharat at a fairly young age. In 1969, he was appointed convener of the All-India Organisations' Heads. This was followed by a stint in the North-East (1977) and then, he took over as the chief of the Bauddhik Cell (the RSS think-tank) two years later. In 1990, he was appointed joint general secretary of the organisation. He has the rare distinction of having held both posts of sharirik (physical exercises) and bauddhik (intellectual) pramukh (chief) on different occasions.

In January 2009, acknowledging his lifelong selfless social service and his vast contribution in nation-building; Shobhit University, Meerut, Uttar Pradesh, conferred upon him Honorary Doctor of Arts (Honoris Causa).

Sarsanghachalak
Sudarshan became Sarsanghachalak (Supreme chief) of the RSS on 10 March 2000. He succeeded Rajendra Singh, who stepped down on health grounds.

In his acceptance speech, Sudarshan recalled how he was hand-picked to head the Madhya Bharat region. He said though initially he was hesitant to take up the responsibility, the then RSS Sarsanghachalak M. S. Golwalkar helped him to make up his mind. "I was able to discharge my duties because people senior to me fully co-operated with me," he said.

A strong votary of swadeshi, he was seen as one of the hard-liners within the RSS. He had often criticised the National Democratic Alliance government in general and the Bharatiya Janata Party in particular for its economic policies. In 2005, his statements suggesting that both Atal Bihari Vajpayee and L. K. Advani step aside and let a younger leadership take charge of the BJP created a rift within the Sangh parivar. He stepped down as Sarsanghachalak on 21 March 2009, due to poor health.

References 

1931 births
2012 deaths
Sarsanghchalaks
People from Raipur, Chhattisgarh
Rashtriya Swayamsevak Sangh sanghchalaks
Rashtriya Swayamsevak Sangh pracharaks